Woodleigh School is an independent, co-educational, K-12 day school located in the Melbourne suburb of Langwarrin South, Victoria, Australia. It has two junior campuses; "Minimbah"  located in Frankston South, and "Penbank" located in Moorooduc. Its senior campus, "Woodleigh"  is located in Langwarrin South.

History
Woodleigh School was founded in 1856 as the St. Paul's School, and operated out of a hall on the grounds of St. Paul's Anglican Church in Frankston. It was the first school in Frankston, as well as one of the earliest in the then colony of Victoria, and is the oldest co-educational school in the state of Victoria.

In 1970, the school moved to a 3.5 ha property off Seaview Road in Frankston South (now Minimbah Court) which it named "Minimbah" – the Bunurong aboriginal word for "place of learning". In 1975, it purchased the former 12.5 ha farm "Woodleigh" on Golf Links Road in Langwarrin South. During this time, the Minimbah site became the junior campus and the Woodleigh site became the senior campus of the school.

After acquiring further land at its Woodleigh site, creating a 22 ha campus, the school changed its name to Woodleigh School in 1999.

Sport 
Woodleigh is a member of the Southern Independent Schools (SIS).

SIS premierships 
Woodleigh has won the following SIS senior premierships.

Boys:

 Basketball (2) - 2001, 2013
 Cricket (3) - 2004, 2006, 2007
 Football (2) - 2008, 2016

Girls:

 Basketball - 2017
 Football (4) - 2006, 2007, 2008, 2015
 Netball (2) - 2004, 2008

References

Private schools in Melbourne
1856 establishments in Australia
Educational institutions established in 1856
Buildings and structures in the City of Frankston